Rugal is a 2020 South Korean television series starring Choi Jin-hyuk, Park Sung-woong, Jo Dong-hyuk, Jung Hye-in, Kim Min-sang, Han Ji-wan and Park Sun-ho. Based on the webtoon of the same name by Rel.mae, it aired on OCN in South Korea and on Netflix worldwide from March 28 to May 17, 2020.

Synopsis 
Rugal tells the story of Kang Gi-beom (Choi Jin-hyuk), an elite police officer attempting to bring down one of South Korea's largest criminal organizations, Argos. In retaliation for his efforts, Kang's wife is killed by hitmen sent by Argos, and Kang is blinded and framed for the murder. Kang is later recruited by the NIS to join a special task force known as "Rugal", whose members are equipped with biotechnology, giving them superhuman abilities. After receiving two artificial eyeballs to regain and enhance his sight, Kang sets off to clear his name and bring those responsible for his wife's death to justice.

Cast

Main 
 Choi Jin-hyuk as Kang Gi-beom
 Park Sung-woong as Hwang Deuk-gu
 Jo Dong-hyuk as Han Tae-kwoong
 Jung Hye-in as Song Mi-na
 Kim Min-sang as Choi Geun-cheol
 Park Sun-ho as Lee Gwang-cheol
 Lee Sang-bo as Yang Moon-bok
 Han Ji-wan as Choi Ye-won

Supporting 
 Jang In-sub as Bradley
 Jang Seo-kyung as Susan
 Park Choong-sun as Dr. Oh
 Yoo Sang-hoon as Min Dal-ho
 Park Jung-hak as Go Yong-duk
 Kim In-woo as Choi-yong
 Yoo Ji-yun as Jang Mi-joo
 Ji Dae-han as Bong Man-chul
 Kim Da-hyun as Seol Min-joon
 Han Gi-yoon as Kim Dae-shik
 Lee Seo-el as Kim Yeo-jin
 Dong Hyun-bae as Lee Jae-han

Production 
The first script reading took place in October 2019 at Donga Digital Media Center in Sangam-dong, Seoul, South Korea.

Ratings

Notes

References

External links 
  
 
 
 Rugal (Korean) at Naver

2020 South Korean television series debuts
2020 South Korean television series endings
OCN television dramas
South Korean science fiction television series
South Korean action television series
National Intelligence Service (South Korea) in fiction
Television shows based on South Korean webtoons
Television series by Studio Dragon
Korean-language Netflix exclusive international distribution programming